The grey-cheeked fulvetta or Morrison's fulvetta (Alcippe morrisonia) is a bird in the family Alcippeidae. The species was first described by Robert Swinhoe in 1863. The grey-cheeked fulvetta is part of a species complex and the nominate morrisonia is now restricted to endemic Taiwan birds, with the David's fulvetta (Alcippe davidi), Huet's fulvetta (Alcippe hueti) and Yunnan fulvetta (Alcippe fratercula) now recognised as a separate species.

Distribution
It is a year-round resident throughout Taiwan. It is found in evergreen mountain forests.

Characteristics
This 15-cm long bird has a grey head with a white eye ring and a long black eye stripe running from the bill down the sides of the neck. The upperparts are olive and the underparts are yellow.

Its call is a weak chi-chi-chu-chui. It will readily join mixed-species feeding flocks.

Notes

References

Collar, N. J. & Robson C. 2007. Family Timaliidae (Babblers)  pp. 70 – 291 in; del Hoyo, J., Elliott, A. & Christie, D.A. eds. Handbook of the Birds of the World, Vol. 12. Picathartes to Tits and Chickadees. Lynx Edicions, Barcelona.
Lekagul, Boonsong,  Round, Philip  A Guide to the Birds of Thailand Saha Karn Baet, 1991 
Robson, Craig A Field Guide to the Birds of Thailand New Holland Press, 2004 

grey-cheeked fulvetta
Birds of South China
Birds of Hainan
Birds of Taiwan
Birds of Southeast Asia
grey-cheeked fulvetta
Taxonomy articles created by Polbot